Gustav von Goßler (born 13 April 1838 in Naumburg; died 29 September 1902 in Danzig) was a German politician for German Conservative Party.

Life 
His father was prussian judge, politician and chancellor of Prussia Karl Gustav von Goßler (1810-1885) and Sophie von Mühler (1816–1877). His brothers were prussian generals Heinrich Wilhelm Martin von Goßler (1841–1927), Konrad Ernst von Goßler (1848–1933) and Albert Theodor Wilhelm von Goßler (1850–1928). He went to school at Kneiphof Gymnasium in Königsberg. Goßler studied German law at Humboldt University of Berlin, at Heidelberg University and at University of Königsberg. 
From 1877 to 1884 Goßler was member of Reichstag. From 1881 to 1891 Goßler was education minister in Prussia.  He followed Robert von Puttkamer. From 1891 to 1902 Goßler was president of province West Prussia.

In 1881, Gossler was for a short time president of Reichstag. On 14 June 1867 he married Mathilde von Simpson (1847-1901) in East Prussia and had several children.

External links

References 

Members of the 3rd Reichstag of the German Empire
Members of the 4th Reichstag of the German Empire
Education ministers of Prussia
Prussian politicians
German Conservative Party politicians
1838 births
1902 deaths